The 2007 Formula 3 Sudamericana season was the 21st Formula 3 Sudamericana season. It began on 24 March 2007, at Autódromo José Carlos Pace in São Paulo and ended on 16 December 2007 also at Autódromo José Carlos Pace in São Paulo. Brazilian driver Clemente de Faria, Jr. won the title.

Drivers and teams
 All drivers competed in Pirelli-shod, Berta-powered Dallara F301s.

Championship standings

References

External links
 Official website

Formula 3 Sudamericana
Sudamericana
Formula 3 Sudamericana seasons
Sudamericana F3